Al Merreikh Football Club also known as Al Merreikh Juba is a South Sudanese football club located in Juba, South Sudan which currently plays in the South Sudan Premier League.

Stadium
Currently the team plays at the 12000 capacity Juba Stadium.

Honours
 South Sudan Premier League: 1
 2018

 South Sudan National Cup: 1
 2018

Performance in CAF competitions

 CAF Confederation Cup: 1 appearance
 2018/19 - Preliminary round

References

External links

Football clubs in South Sudan